Lake Matahina is a reservoir in the Bay of Plenty region of New Zealand, located immediately south of the settlement of Te Mahoe and 50 km east of Rotorua. The lake was formed by the construction of the Matahina Power Station and its associated 86 m tall Matahina Dam on the Rangitaiki River, which was completed in 1967.

In 1969, five children drowned after driving a car into Lake Matahina at a camp that New Zealand author Barry Crump helped to run. Crump was charged with manslaughter over the deaths, but these charges were dropped. Fleur Adcock, one of Crump's ex-wives, said that it was negligence on his behalf that the children died.

Depth 

Upper reaches of the lake are shallow (1 to 4 m), with a sinuous channel constricted by a narrow ignimbrite gorge.

Lake levels 
The lake's operating levels are as follows:

Sedimentation

Since its creation the Matahina dam has acted as an effective barrier to the seaward movement of sediment by the Rangitaiki River. Pre-dam annual discharge figures for suspended and bed load sediment near the river mouth were about 201 000 and 188 000 tonne respectively, but equivalent post-dam values have dropped to 65 000 and 10 000 tonne.
This trapping of sediment has halted or substantially reduced the downstream historical rising river bed and coastal progradation of the Rangitaiki plains.

While principal capture of sediment occurs at the upstream Aniwhenua dam which was completed in 1982, an increasing amount of sediment is being deposited in the deep portion of Lake Matahina.

References

External links 

Rangitaiki River at Matahina Dam. Describes swimming options at the lake.

Lakes of the Bay of Plenty Region
Matahina